ThedaCare may refer to:
 ThedaCare Regional Medical Center–Appleton
 ThedaCare Regional Medical Center–Neenah